Engal Thangam is a 1970 Indian Tamil-language action film directed by Krishnan–Panju. The film stars M. G. Ramachandran and Jayalalithaa. It was released on 9 October 1970 and became a success, besides winning three Tamil Nadu State Film Awards.

Plot 

Thangam, a truck driver comes to the rescue of Sumathi, his blind younger sister, by putting on (by assuming) the offences of Moorthy, her husband. Moorthy is a childhood friend of Thangam. Today, Moorthy fell to the hands of a mysterious group of burglars, because he is the best professional safe-cracker in the city. Thangam wants at all costs to save him from this gang and to stop them. Thangam will be helped in his quest by Kaladevi, his lover.

Cast 
 M. G. Ramachandran as Thangam
 Ramachandran also briefly appears as himself at the beginning of the film
 A. V. M. Rajan as Moorthy
 Jayalalithaa as Kaladevi
 Pushpalatha as Sumathi
 S. A. Ashokan as Selvaraj
 Cho as lorry cleaner
 Thengai Srinivasan as Pidhambar

Production 
On learning that M. Karunanidhi and Murasoli Maran were bankrupt, M. G. Ramachandran acted in Engal Thangam without taking any remuneration.

Themes 
The colours of the Dravida Munnetra Kazhagam (DMK) flag – red and black – are featured in the attire Ramachandran frequently wears in the film as his character. The song "Naan Sethu Pulachavanda", where he sings that he has risen from the dead, is a reference to Ramachandran having survived a gunshot wound inflicted on his throat by M. R. Radha in 1967.

Soundtrack 
Music is composed by M. S. Viswanathan, with lyrics by Vaali. The song "Don't Touch Mr X" includes English lyrics. "Thangapadhakkathin Mele" was remixed in Vetrivel Sakthivel (2005).

Release and reception 
Engal Thangam was released on 9 October 1970, and distributed by Venus Movies. The film ran for over 100 days in theatres. It won the Tamil Nadu State Film Award for Best Film – Second Prize, Vaali won the Tamil Nadu State Film Award for Best Lyricist, and Pushpalatha won the Tamil Nadu State Film Award for Best Character Artiste (Female).

References

Bibliography

External links 
 

1970 action films
1970 films
1970s Tamil-language films
Films directed by Krishnan–Panju
Films scored by M. S. Viswanathan
Indian action films